Westmount Square is a residential and office complex located in Westmount, Quebec, Canada. There are two residential apartment buildings and two office buildings. These towers sit atop an underground shopping centre consisting of thirty-five shops. It is located between Saint Catherine Street and De Maisonneuve Boulevard and between Wood Avenue and Greene Avenue. It is connected to Place Alexis Nihon, Dawson College, and the Atwater Metro station by a tunnel.

The complex was designed by architect Ludwig Mies van der Rohe in the International style. Construction began in 1964 and the complex opened on December 13, 1967. The exterior facade features curtain walls, and is made of black anodized aluminum and smoked glass windows. It was modeled on Lake Shore Drive Apartments in Chicago.

The other office building has 2 floors and is known as the Tower 4 Pavilion; it was formerly the Eastern Airlines Building.

Westmount Square's shopping concourse houses boutiques and art galleries, with about one-third of the space reserved for private for-profit health clinics. Skylights were installed on the roof of the shopping concourse in 1990, which led to criticism among architectural preservationists.

See also
 List of malls in Montreal
 Nuns' Island gas station

References

External links
Official website

Buildings and structures completed in 1967
Ludwig Mies van der Rohe buildings
International style architecture in Canada
Skyscrapers in Montreal
Shopping malls in Montreal
Buildings and structures in Westmount, Quebec
Apartment buildings in Quebec
Skyscraper office buildings in Canada
Residential skyscrapers in Canada